Abdelsalam Faraj Omar Elfaitory (born 22 July 1993), also spelled as Abdesalam Farag Omar Elfeitouri, is a Libyan footballer who plays for Al-Hilal as a striker.

International career
Elfaitory played his first international game with the senior national team on 7 June 2013 against DR Congo (0–0), where came in as a substitute for Éamon Zayed in the 62nd minute.

Honours
Libya
African Nations Championship (1): 2014

References

External links
 

1993 births
Living people
Libyan footballers
Libya international footballers
Association football forwards
Al-Hilal SC (Benghazi) players
Zakho FC players
Iraqi Premier League players
Expatriate footballers in Iraq
Libyan Premier League players
Libya A' international footballers
2014 African Nations Championship players
Libyan expatriate sportspeople in Iraq
Libyan expatriate footballers